The Silver Republican Party, later known as the Lincoln Republican Party, was a United States political party from 1896 to 1901. It was so named because it split from the Republican Party by supporting free silver (effectively, expansionary monetary policy) and bimetallism. The main Republican Party opposed free silver and supported the gold standard. Silver Republican strength was concentrated in the Western states where silver mining was an important industry.  A leading spokesman in the House of Representatives was Willis Sweet of Idaho. Silver Republicans were elected to the Congress from several Western states. In both the 1896 and 1900 presidential elections, Silver Republicans supported Democratic presidential nominee William Jennings Bryan over Republican nominee William McKinley. 

In 1901, the Silver Republican Party disbanded and most of its members rejoined the Republican Party, particularly after Theodore Roosevelt became president in September 1901. However, some Silver Republicans, such as Senator Fred Dubois of Idaho and former Secretary of the Interior Henry M. Teller of Colorado, joined the Democratic Party instead in order to aid the Bryan wing of the party against the conservative Bourbon Democrats.

Noted Silver Republicans 

 Jonathan Bourne Jr. – Senator from Oregon
 Frank J. Cannon – Senator from Utah
 Fred Dubois – Senator from Idaho
 Lee Mantle – Senator from Montana
 Richard F. Pettigrew – Senator from South Dakota
 John F. Shafroth – Representative from Colorado, later Governor and Senator
 Willis Sweet – Representative from Idaho
 William Morris Stewart – Senator from Nevada
 Henry M. Teller – Senator and Secretary of the Interior from Colorado
 Edgar Wilson – Representative from Idaho
 Charles A. Towne – Senator from Minnesota

See also 
 National Democratic Party, The party of gold supporters who left the Democratic Party in 1896
 Silver Party

Further reading 
 Clinch, Thomas A. Urban Populism and Free Silver in Montana: A Narrative of Ideology in Political Action (University of Montana Press, 1970).
 Ellis, Elmer. "The Silver Republicans in the Election of 1896." Mississippi Valley Historical Review 18.4 (1932): 519-534. online
 Johnson, Claudius O. "The Story of Silver Politics in Idaho, 1892-1902." Pacific Northwest Quarterly  (1942): 283-296. online
 Wellborn, Fred. "The Influence of the Silver-Republican Senators, 1889-1891." Mississippi Valley Historical Review 14.4 (1928): 462-480.  online
 Williams, Robert Earl. "The Silver Republican Movement in Montana." (Master's thesis, Montana State University, 1965). online
 Young, Bradley J. "Silver, discontent, and conspiracy: The ideology of the Western Republican revolt of 1890-1901." Pacific Historical Review 64.2 (1995): 243-65.  online

Defunct political parties in the United States
Silver
Progressive Era in the United States
Metallism
Political parties established in 1896
1896 establishments in the United States
Political parties disestablished in 1900
1900 disestablishments in the United States
Political parties in the United States